Argyros (derived from , "silver"), feminine Argyre, Latinized as Argyrus and Argyra, was the name of a prominent aristocratic family of Roman Emperors of the Byzantine Empire active from the middle of the 9th century until the very end of the Empire in the 15th century, although it passed its peak after the mid-11th century. The name also evolved the variant forms Argyropoulos and the feminine Argyropoulina.

The Argyroi apparently originated in the province of Charsianon, where they had large estates. They hence belonged to the Anatolian land-holding military aristocracy (the "dynatoi"); indeed, they are among the earliest, and almost archetypal, such families to emerge, along with the Doukai. The family is first securely attested in the mid-9th century, but may have its origins in a certain patrikios Marianos and his son Eustathios, who was captured by the Umayyads in 740/41 and executed after refusing to convert to Islam.

Beginning with the family's founder, Leo Argyros, most of the early members were military officers, such as Eustathios Argyros and his sons Leo and Pothos, or Basil Argyros in the 11th century. Basil's brother, the only Argyros from the family's heyday to have become a civil service official, became Emperor Romanos III Argyros (r. 1028–34). Alexios I Komnenos was engaged to marry an Argyros lady, but she died before the wedding. In the Komnenian period the family declined in status, and the later Argyroi or Argyropouloi were mostly landholders or intellectuals, among others the astronomer Isaac Argyros and the humanist John Argyropoulos.

References

Sources